Nathalie Bassire (born 22 January 1968) is a French politician of Republicans (LR) who has been serving as a member of the National Assembly since 2017, representing Réunion's 3rd constituency.

Political career
Bassire is a municipal councillor for Le Tampon, and since 2008 a member of the General Council of Réunion.  Since 2015 she has also been a member of the regional council.

In parliament, Bassire serves on the Sustainable Development, Spatial and Regional Planning Committee.

Ahead of the 2022 presidential elections, Bassire publicly declared her support for Valérie Pécresse as the Republicans’ candidate. She was re-elected at the 2022 French legislative election.

She ran for re-election in the 2022 legislative elections and was re-elected in the second round with 51.87% of the votes cast. On June 28, 2022, she ran for president of the National Assembly for the Libertés, indépendants, outre-mer et territoires group and received 16 votes.

References

External links
 Nathalie Bassire's page on the French National Assembly page

Living people
Deputies of the 15th National Assembly of the French Fifth Republic
Deputies of the 16th National Assembly of the French Fifth Republic
21st-century French women politicians
Women members of the National Assembly (France)
1968 births
People from Saint-Pierre, Réunion
Members of Parliament for Réunion